The Moomba Masters Tournament is a water ski and wakeboard tournament occurring during Moomba Festival since 1959.

References

Wakeboarding
Water skiing competitions
Water sports competitions